Cromarcha is a genus of snout moths. It was described by Harrison Gray Dyar Jr. in 1914.

Species
Cromarcha polybata
Cromarcha stroudagnesia

References

Chrysauginae
Pyralidae genera